Grant Stafford and Kevin Ullyett were the defending champions. Stafford chose to compete at Indianapolis in the same week. Ullyett partnered with Piet Norval but lost in the semifinals to the eventual champions Justin Gimelstob and Sébastien Lareau. Justin Gimelstob and Sébastien Lareau won in the final over David Adams and John-Laffnie de Jager, 7–5, 6–7(2–7), 6–3.

Seeds
The first four seeds received a bye to the second round.

Draw

Finals

Top half

Bottom half

References

External links
 Official results archive (ATP)
 Official results archive (ITF)

1999 ATP Tour